Imam Birgivi (27 March 1522 – 15 March 1573) was a Hanafi scholar and moralist who lived during the height of the Ottoman Empire and whose texts are used to this day as manuals of spiritual practice throughout the Muslim world. His full name, in Arabic, is Taqī al-Dīn Muḥammad ibn Pīr ʿAlī al-Birgawī.

Life 
Born Muḥammad ibn Pīr ʿAlī, in Balikesir, Ottoman Empire, in 1522, Muḥammad was sent to the capital Istanbul to study theology as a young man. Later, he studied law under the chief military judge (kazasker) of the Ottoman Empire.

After working as a judge for a short period in Edirne, Birgivi became an ascetic, resigning from his government post and returning his salary.  However, he was instructed by ʿAṭāʾ Allāh Efendi to become a teacher of religion and morals instead.  Through the gift of a patron, a medrese was founded in the town of Birgi near Izmir and Muḥammad was appointed as its head teacher (müderris). Now known as Imam Birgivi, his fame quickly spread as a result of his teaching and his books.

Birgivi and his disciples were vocal critics of corruption within the Empire and without, particularly decrying the twisting of Islamic teachings for the benefit of the rich. At one point Birgivi traveled to the capital of the Empire and personally took the prime minister to task.  This reprimand was taken well by the minister, who consulted him on how to cure the degeneration of the Islamic virtues.

Imam Birgivi lived in Birgi until his death from the plague at the age of fifty-one.

Works 
Imam Birgivi is known to be the author of some the twenty-seven works, dealing with theology, the art of reciting the Qurʾān, dogmatics and various legal issues. He is most famous for his catechism in Turkish entitled Risale-i Birgivi, also known as the Vasiyetname, available in many printed editions, and translated into several European languages. He also wrote Dhukhr al-Muta'ahhilin wa Nisa' fi ta'rif al-Athar wa al-Dima, an authoritative work on: menstruation, lochia, and related issues in the Hanafi school of fiqh (jurisprudence), which the majority of Muslims follow. Ibn Abidin wrote a commentary on it and attached great importance to it.

References

External links 
 An extensive biography of Imam Birgivi

Hanafis
Maturidis
Mujaddid
1522 births
1573 deaths
Proto-Salafists
People from Balıkesir
16th-century scientists from the Ottoman Empire
16th-century writers from the Ottoman Empire
16th-century Muslim scholars of Islam
Islamic philosophers
Ottoman Sufis
Islamic scholars from the Ottoman Empire